Call of the South Seas is a 1944 American action film directed by John English starring Janet Martin, Allan Lane and William Henry.

The film's sets were designed by the art director Gano Chittenden.

Cast
 Janet Martin as Princess Tahia  
 Allan Lane as Kendall Gaige  
 William Henry as Agent Paul Russell  
 Roy Barcroft as Steve Landrau  
 Wally Vernon as Handsome 
 Adele Mara as Aritana  
 Duncan Renaldo as Commissioner Charcot  
 Frank Jaquet as Judge Fator  
 Anna Demetrio as Latona  
 Richard Alexander as Bailey  
 Nina Campana as Nona  
 Satini Pualoa as Kualu  
 Budd Buster as Kanahu  
 John Eberts as Manu 
 Margia Dean as Waitress

See also
List of American films of 1944

References

Bibliography
 Langman, Larry. Return to Paradise: A Guide to South Sea Island Films. Scarecrow Press, 1998.

External links
 

1944 films
1940s action films
American action films
Films directed by John English
Republic Pictures films
American black-and-white films
Films set in Oceania
1940s English-language films
1940s American films